Erica Faye Watson (February 26, 1973 – February 27, 2021) was an American actress, comedian and writer. She is best known for her roles in Precious and Chi-Raq.

Early life and education
Watson was born on February 26, 1973, and grew up in Chicago. She attended St. Thomas the Apostle Elementary School and Kenwood Academy High School. She graduated from Columbia College Chicago in 1998 with a degree in film directing and a masters in Master of Arts in entertainment and media management in 2005.

Career 
Following graduation, Watson moved to New York City where she performed comedy and a one-woman show in 2010 which examined her identity a plus-size Black woman. She returned to Chicago after the show's tour where she took on roles in Precious, Chi-Raq, Empire, and The Chi.

Personal life 
She died of complications from COVID-19 in Montego Bay, where she had been living until her death, one day after her 48th birthday during the COVID-19 pandemic in Jamaica.

Filmography

Film

Television

References

External links
 

1973 births
2021 deaths
Place of birth missing
20th-century African-American people
20th-century African-American women
21st-century African-American people
21st-century African-American women
Actresses from Chicago
African-American actresses
American actresses
American expatriates in Jamaica
Deaths from the COVID-19 pandemic in Jamaica